Cumtu Chin People, one of the tribes of the Chin people, are native to Rakhine State: Myebon, Minbya, Ann and Kyauktaw townships - and some in Yangon Region. They are well educated and having high-profile jobs in the Myanmar government.

Demography 
The native speakers of Cumtu language are around  14,000(2007 SIL). The total population of the Cumtu people are also around  14,000(2007 SIL). They are also known as Plain Chin, as they are living in the plains of Myanmar. Unlike other Chin clans, their main problem is communications among themselves due to distances between their villages, not the differences in their dialects.

Religion 
Most of them (around 86% of Cumtu people) are Christian: Roman Catholic, Baptist and Protestant .

References 

Mizo clans